Maisonave is a surname. Notable people with the surname include:

Héctor Maisonave (born 1930), American music entrepreneur and talent manager
Wilfredo Maisonave (born 1951), Puerto Rican long jumper